Caitlin Whoriskey (born February 19, 1988) is an American professional tennis player. She played collegiately at the University of Tennessee, where she was a three-time All-American.

Whoriskey finished runner-up in doubles at the 2010 NCAA Women's Tennis Championship, playing with Natalie Pluskota. She recorded a victory in her first-ever ITF tournament as a professional, partnering with Kaitlyn Christian and taking the doubles crown at the 2010 Mt. Pleasant Pro Classic.

College career
Whoriskey played her college tennis for co-head coaches Mike Patrick and Sonia-Hahn Patrick at the University of Tennessee. She recorded 92 singles victories and 113 doubles wins in her four years at UT. Her doubles total ranks fourth in school history. She was a three-time ITA All-America selection: twice in doubles (2009–10) and once in singles (2009). She captured the doubles championship at the ITA All-American Championships in 2007 and 2009, the first such wins in school history. A three time All-SEC selection, she helped lead Tennessee on its deepest postseason run since 2002 during the 2009–10 season, when the Lady Vols advanced to the quarterfinals of the NCAA Championships. Paired with teammate Natalie Pluskota, she reached the finals of the 2010 NCAA Women's Doubles Championship before falling to Hilary Barte and Lindsay Burdette of Stanford. She was named ITA National Senior Player of the Year for the 2009–10 season.

Professional career
Whoriskey recorded her first-ever professional title in June 2010, winning the doubles crown at the 2010 Mt. Pleasant Women's Pro Classic, defeating Petra Rampre and Shelby Rogers in the final round. She followed that up with another doubles title at the Ladies Cleveland Open on June 27.

ITF Circuit finals

Singles: 9 (2 titles, 7 runner-ups)

Doubles: 33 (18 titles, 15 runner-ups)

References

External links
 
 
 

1988 births
Living people
American female tennis players
University of Tennessee alumni
Tennis people from Massachusetts
21st-century American women
Tennessee Volunteers women's tennis players